Heriaesynaema is a monotypic genus of African crab spiders containing the single species, Heriaesynaema flavipes. It was first described by Lodovico di Caporiacco in 1939, and is found in Ethiopia.

See also
 List of Thomisidae species

References

Endemic fauna of Ethiopia
Monotypic Araneomorphae genera
Spiders of Africa
Thomisidae